Spring Creek is an unincorporated community in Caddo County, Oklahoma, United States. It has a cemetery, church, schoolhouse, and general store still standing. The cemetery and church are still used. The remaining general store (there were once two at the same time) is now a house. The schoolhouse is block and was built around the turn of the 20th century. The surrounding area is very sandy and features much red rock.

References

Unincorporated communities in Caddo County, Oklahoma
Unincorporated communities in Oklahoma